Paolo Buffa (1903–1970) was an Italian architect and furniture designer.

References

1903 births
1970 deaths
20th-century Italian architects
Italian furniture designers